Georges Baert (4 June 1926 – 5 October 2017) was a Belgian basketball player. He competed in the men's tournament at the 1948 Summer Olympics.

References

1926 births
2017 deaths
Belgian men's basketball players
Olympic basketball players of Belgium
Basketball players at the 1948 Summer Olympics
Sportspeople from Ghent